Chris Howland (30 July 1928 – 29 November 2013) was a British radio and TV presenter. For most of his career he worked in (Western) Germany, where he started a few years after World War II at BFN in Hamburg. He became a popular disc jockey and presenter also at German networks. He also was a prolific Schlager-singer and starred in films.

Early life 
Howland was born in London and brought up in Southern England and became a professional beekeeper.

Career

Radio 
In 1948 he started working for the BFN in Germany.

The British programmes were popular among German youths who would rather listen to British music than to the comparatively slow contemporary German music. So his popularity subsequently soon exceeded his actual target audience.
Howland also got acquainted with the German language. In 1952, when he already spoke German fluently, he was hired by the Nordwestdeutscher Rundfunk broadcaster.
Still, when he debuted six years later as a singer, he did it in German and had two hits. But in 1959 he stopped doing radio shows and returned to Britain.

Television 
On British TV Howland had a show called Peoples and Places but he was not as popular as in Germany where the audiences loved his British accent.
So after two years he continued his career in Germany.
Here he got a show called Studio B, which featured pop stars in a new way that included a lot of humour. The show was broadcast more than sixty times. Howland's next coup was a version of Candid Camera for German TV.

Cinema 
From 1954, Howland acted in more than twenty films, including six European Karl May films. In 2007 he appeared in a parody on German Edgar Wallace feature films.
He acted mainly in comedies which were carried out in a style quite like the British Carry On films.

Like the Dutch TV entertainer Rudi Carrell and American musician Bill Ramsey (who also appeared as guest in Howland's show "Studio B"), Howland made his accent his trademark.

Later career and death 
Until his death, Howland lived outside Cologne and worked again as a radio presenter
and appeared occasionally as an actor or talker on TV. In 2009 he published his memoirs Yes, Sir. The book was well received.

Howland died on 29 November 2013.

Selected filmography 
 Ball of Nations (1954)
 The Major and the Bulls (1955)
 Engagement at Wolfgangsee (1956)
 Widower with Five Daughters (1957)
 The Blue Sea and You (1959)
 A Thousand Stars Aglitter (1959)
 I Learned That in Paris (1960)
 The White Spider (1963)
 The Black Panther of Ratana (1964)
 Mission to Hell (1964)
 The Shoot (1964)
 Legacy of the Incas (1965)
  (1965)

References

External links 

Official page of his last radio show

1928 births
2013 deaths
British emigrants to Germany
English DJs
English male journalists
English radio presenters
English pop singers
English television presenters
English male film actors
20th-century English male actors
Westdeutscher Rundfunk people